Shane McGuckin (born 1969) is an Irish retired hurler who played for club sides St Rynagh's and Naomh Éanna and at inter-county level with the Offaly senior hurling team.

Career

Born in Banagher, County Offaly, McGuckin first came to prominence on the St. Rynagh's club side that won four County Championship title in six seasons between 1987 and 1993. The last of these was converted into a Leinster Club Championship title. Success at club level saw McGuckin drafted onto the Offaly senior team during the 1990-91 National League. He collected his first silverware with the team in 1994 when Offaly won the Leinster Championship before ending the season as an All-Ireland Championship-winner after a defeat of Limerick in the final. McGuckin won a second successive provincial title the following year before captaining the team for the 1996 season. His son, Charlie McGuckin, has lined out for the Wexford senior hurling team.

Honours

St. Rynagh's
Leinster Senior Club Hurling Championship: 1993
Offaly Senior Hurling Championship: 1987, 1990, 1992, 1993

Offaly
All-Ireland Senior Hurling Championship: 1994
Leinster Senior Hurling Championship: 1994, 1995
National Hurling League: 1990-91

References

1969 births
Living people
UCD hurlers
St Rynagh's hurlers
Naomh Éanna hurlers
Offaly inter-county hurlers
All-Ireland Senior Hurling Championship winners
Irish veterinarians